Wang Daxie (1860–1929) was a Chinese politician who twice served as Premier of the Republic of China.

1860 births
1929 deaths
Politicians from Hangzhou
Qing dynasty diplomats
Republic of China politicians from Zhejiang
Premiers of the Republic of China
Ambassadors of China to Japan